Double Knob is a summit in the U.S. state of Georgia.

Double Knob was descriptively named on account of its double-peaked outline. A variant name is "Double Knob Mountain".

References

Mountains of Gilmer County, Georgia
Mountains of Georgia (U.S. state)